The Flute sonata in E minor (HWV 379) was composed (circa 1727-28) by George Frideric Handel for flute and basso continuo. The work is also referred to as Opus 1 No. 1a, and was first published in 1879 by Chrysander. Other catalogues of Handel's music have referred to the work as HG xxvii,2; and HHA iv/3,2.

The work is the only sonata that survives as a flute sonata in Handel's own manuscript.

Of the two sonatas published in the Chrysander edition as Opus 1 Sonata I, this one (Sonata Ia) is not in the Walsh edition. Therefore, (although the work's authenticity remains unquestioned), this sonata is not strictly part of Handel's "Opus 1". Chrysander's Sonata Ia and Sonata Ib have their first and fourth movements in common.

A typical performance of the work takes about 13 minutes.

Movements
The work consists of five movements:

(Movements do not contain repeat markings unless indicated. The number of bars is taken from the Chrysander edition, and is the raw number in the manuscript—not including repeat markings.)

See also
Handel flute sonatas
List of solo sonatas by George Frideric Handel
XV Handel solo sonatas (publication by Chrysander)
Handel solo sonatas (publication by Walsh)

References

Flute sonatas by George Frideric Handel